Merrifieldia alaica is a moth of the family Pterophoridae that is found in Kyrgyzstan, Russia and Afghanistan. The species was first described by Aristide Caradja in 1920.

References

Moths described in 1920
alaica
Moths of Asia
Taxa named by Aristide Caradja